Wheelchair Tennis at the 2017 ASEAN Para Games was held at National Tennis Centre, Jalan Duta, Kuala Lumpur.

Medal tally

Medalists

See also
Tennis at the 2017 Southeast Asian Games

External links
 Wheelchair tennis games results system

2017 ASEAN Para Games
Wheelchair tennis at the ASEAN Para Games